Nizhnezubrilovsky is a rural locality (a khutor) in Mirnoye Rural Settlement, Novonikolayevsky District, Volgograd Oblast, Russia. The population was 130 as of 2010. There are 2 streets.

Geography 
Nizhnezubrilovsky is located in steppe, on the Khopyorsko-Buzulukskaya Plain, on the left bank of the Kardail River, 61 km northeast of Novonikolayevsky (the district's administrative centre) by road. Verkhnezubrilovsky is the nearest rural locality.

References 

Rural localities in Novonikolayevsky District